Pandivere Upland (or Pandivere Heights) is hilly area of higher elevation in Northern Estonia.

It contains the highest point of Northern Estonia: Emumägi (166 m).

The area is named for the village of Pandivere.

References

Hills of Estonia